Vātsyāyana was an ancient Indian philosopher, known for authoring the Kama Sutra. He lived in India during the second or third century CE, probably in Pataliputra (modern day Patna in Bihar). 

He is not to be confused with Pakṣilasvāmin Vātsyāyana, the author of Nyāya Sutra Bhāshya, the first preserved commentary on Gotama's Nyāya Sutras. His name is sometimes erroneously confused with Mallanaga, the seer of the Asuras, to whom the origin of erotic science is attributed.

Biography

Hardly anything is known about Vātsyāyana from sources outside the Kāmasūtra itself. Vātsyāyana's interest in refined human, including sexual, behavior as a means of fulfilment, was recorded in his treatise Kama Sutra.

At the close of the Kama Sutra this is what he writes about himself:

After reading and considering the works of Babhravya and other ancient authors, and thinking over the meaning of the rules given by them, this treatise was composed, according to the precepts of the Holy Writ, for the benefit of the world, by Vatsyayana, while leading the life of a religious student at Benares, and wholly engaged in the contemplation of the Deity. This work is not to be used merely as an instrument for satisfying our desires. A person acquainted with the true principles of this science, who preserves his Dharma (virtue or religious merit), his Artha (worldly wealth) and his Kama (pleasure or sensual gratification), and who has regard to the customs of the people, is sure to obtain the mastery over his senses. In short, an intelligent and knowing person attending to Dharma and Artha and also to Kama, without becoming the slave of his passions, will obtain success in everything that he may do.

Some believe that he must have lived between the 1st and 6th century CE, on the following grounds: He mentions that Satakarni Satavahana, a king of Kuntal, killed Malayevati his wife with an instrument called Katari  by striking her in the passion of love. Vatsyayana quotes this case to warn people of the danger arising from some old customs of striking women when under the influence of sexual passion. This king of Kuntal is believed to have lived and reigned, consequently Vatsyayana must have lived after him. On the other hand, another author, Varahamihira, in the eighteenth chapter of his "Brihatsanhita", discusses of the science of love, and appears to have borrowed largely from Vatsyayana on the subject.  Some believe that Varahamihira lived during the 6th century and therefore Vatsyayana must have written his works before the 6th century.

See also 
 Vatsyayana cipher

Notes

References
 Fosse, Lars Martin, The Kamasutra. YogaVidya.com, Woodstock NY, 2012
 Doniger, Wendy & Kakar, Sudhir, Vatsyayana's Kamasutra. Oxford University Press, USA, 2009

External links

 
 
 
 Vatsyayana Kamasutra – Complete translation 
 Original introduction to Lars Martin Fosse's translation of the Kamasutra

Indian logicians
Nyaya
Philosophers of love
Ancient Indian philosophers
Sanskrit writers